Tammy Lohmann is an American, former collegiate softball shortstop and first basemen and current head coach for San Jose State. She was formerly an assistant coach and interim head coach at California.

Coaching career

Wisconsin
On September 11, 2002, Lohmann was announced as a new assistant coach for the Wisconsin softball program.

California
On September 1, 2005, Lohmann was named assistant coach for the California Golden Bears softball team. On March 3, 2020, she was named interim head coach at California when longtime head coach Diane Ninemire stepped down as head coach mid-season.

San Jose State
On September 3, 2020, Lohmann was named head coach for the San Jose State Spartans softball team.

Head coaching record

College

Notes

References

Living people
Softball players from California
Arizona State Sun Devils softball players
Bradley Braves softball coaches
Wisconsin Badgers softball coaches
California Golden Bears softball coaches
American softball coaches
Year of birth missing (living people)